Penney (also spelled Penny) is a common surname of British origin.

The name Penney dates from the ancient Anglo-Saxon culture of Britain. It was derived from the Old English "Penig," denoting a coin (cognate with German "Pfennig"). The penny was the only unit of coinage in England until the early 14th century, and as such was a coin of considerable value.

The name was first found in Northampton where they held a family seat from very early times; before the 12th century had become associated with London; later moved north into Scotland and west into Ireland settling mostly in the provinces of Ulster and Munster.

Some of the first settlers of this name or some of its variants were: George Penny who settled in the Barbados in 1635; William Penny settled on Eastern Long Island prior to 1740; Charles Penny settled in Maryland in 1775; P. Penny settled in Boston, Massachusetts in 1769; the family also settled in Pennsylvania in the 18th century. In Newfoundland, Benedict Penny inherited property in Carbonear which dated back to 1699.

Spelling variations include: Penny, Penney, Pennie, Penne, Pyne, Pynne and others.

People named Penney

Alphonsus Liguori Penney (1924-2017) Canadian Archbishop
Darby Penney (1952-2021), American writer, activist
David Penney (born 1964), English Football Player/Manager
Gail Penney (born 1959), New Zealand blog writer 
James Cash Penney (1875–1971), American Businessman, Founder of JC Penney
Kirk Penney (born 1980), New Zealand basketball player
Roger Penney, American singer, songwriter and multi-instrumentalist
Stef Penney (born 1969), Scottish novelist and filmmaker
Steve Penney (born 1961), NHL goaltender from Canada; played with the Winnipeg Jets and the 1986 Stanley Cup Champions, the Montreal Canadiens
Frederick Penney (1816–1869), Scottish chemist 
Steve Penney (born 1964), Irish Footballer, played in the 1986 World Cup
Trevor Penney (born 1968), English cricket coach and former player
William George Penney (1909–1991), British Physicist and one of the participants in The Manhattan Project

See also
List of Old English (Anglo-Saxon) surnames
Penny (disambiguation)